The following list is a discography of production credited to Pete Rock, an American hip hop record producer and recording artist from Mount Vernon, New York. It includes a list of songs produced, co-produced and remixed by year, artist, album and title.

1989

Heavy D & the Boyz - Big Tyme 
 04. "Mood for Love" (co-produced by Eddie F and Heavy D)
 06. "A Better Land" (co-produced by Heavy D)
 09. "Big Tyme" (co-produced by Eddie F)
 12. "Let It Flow" (co-produced by Eddie F and Heavy D)

1990

Groove B Chill - Starting From Zero 
 01. "Starting From Zero"
 02. "There It Is"

1991

Brand Nubian 
 "How Ya Livin'"

Kid 'n Play - Face the Nation 
 04. "Next Question"
 10. "Bill's At the Door"

Main Source - Breaking Atoms 
 11. "Vamos a Rapiar" (co-produced by Large Professor)

Heavy D & the Boyz - Peaceful Journey 
 02. "Let It Rain" 
 05. "Don't Curse" (featuring Big Daddy Kane, Grand Puba, Kool G Rap, Q-Tip, Pete Rock & CL Smooth)
 08. "Cuz He'z Alwayz Around"
 10. "Letter to the Future"
 13. "Do Me, Do Me"

Pete Rock & CL Smooth - All Souled Out 
 01. "Good Life"
 02. "Mecca & The Soul Brother"
 03. "Go With The Flow"
 04. "The Creator"
 05. "All Souled Out"

1992

Doug E. Fresh - Doin' What I Gotta Do 
 15. "No"

A.D.O.R. - Let It All Hang Out 12" 
 A1. "Let It All Hang Out"

Redman - Whut? Thee Album 
 18. "How to Roll a Blunt" (co-produced by Redman)

K-Solo - Time's Up 
 02. "Letterman"

Pete Rock & CL Smooth - Mecca and the Soul Brother 
 01. "Return of the Mecca"
 02. "For Pete's Sake"
 03. "Ghettos of the Mind"
 04. "Lots of Lovin" (co-produced by Nevelle Hodge)
 05. "Act Like You Know" (co-produced by Large Professor)
 06. "Straighten It Out"
 07. "Soul Brother #1"
 08. "Wig Out"
 09. "Anger in the Nation"
 10. "They Reminisce Over You (T.R.O.Y.)"
 11. "On and On"
 12. "It's Like That"
 13. "Can't Front on Me"
 14. "The Basement" (featuring Grap Luva, Heavy D, Rob-O, Deda)
 15. "If It Ain't Rough, It Ain't Right"
 16. "Skinz" (featuring Grand Puba)

Heavy D & the Boyz - Blue Funk 
 05. "It's a New Day"
 07. "Love Sexy"
 11. "Blue Funk"

1993

Run-D.M.C. - Down with the King 
 01. "Down with the King" (featuring Pete Rock & C.L. Smooth) 
 10. "In The House"
 14. "Wreck Shop"

DJ Jazzy Jeff & The Fresh Prince - Code Red 
 01. "Somethin' Like Dis"
 06. "Code Red"

Various artists - Who's the Man? (soundtrack) 
 03. "What's Next on the Menu?" - performed by Pete Rock & C.L. Smooth

Various artists - Poetic Justice (soundtrack) 
 03. "One in a Million" - performed by Pete Rock & C.L. Smooth

Various artists - Menace II Society (soundtrack) 
 10. "Death Becomes You" - performed by Pete Rock & C.L. Smooth & YG'z

Da Youngsta's - The Aftermath 
 03. "Iz U Wit Me"
 07. "Who's the Mic Wrecka"

Father MC - Sex Is Law 
 02. "R&B Swinger"

YG'z - Street Nigga 
 01. "Street Nigga"
 02. "Ghetto Celeb"
 03. "Sumthin' 4 Da Head"
 06. "Street Nigga (Pete Rock Remix)"

Pete Rock & CL Smooth - Lots of Lovin 12" 
 B1. "It's Not a Game"

1994

Nas - Illmatic 
 04. "The World Is Yours"

Slick Rick - Behind Bars 
 07. "I'm Captive"
 08. "Get a Job"

Heavy D & the Boyz - Nuttin' but Love 
 02. "Sex with You" (co-produced by Heavy D)
 03. "Got Me Waiting" (co-produced by Heavy D)
 11. "Black Coffee" (co-produced by Easy Mo Bee)

Shazzy - Pass Anotha Bag 12" 
 A1. "Pass Anotha Bag"

Pete Rock & CL Smooth - The Main Ingredient 
 01. "In the House"
 02. "Carmel City"
 03. "I Get Physical"
 04. "Sun Won't Come Out" 
 05. "I Got a Love"
 06. "Escape"
 07. "The Main Ingredient"
 08. "Worldwide"
 09. "All the Places"
 10. "Tell Me"
 11. "Take You There"
 12. "Searching"
 13. "Check It Out"
 14. "In the Flesh"
 15. "It's on You"
 16. "Get on the Mic"

1995

AZ - Doe or Die 
 03. "Gimme Yours"
 05. "Rather Unique"

INI - The Life I Live 
(Due to distribution issues, this LP was shelved until it appeared on the Lost & Found: Hip Hop Underground Soul Classics in 2003.)

 01. "Intro"
 02. "No More Words"
 04. "Think Twice" (featuring Pete Rock)
 05. "Square One"
 06. "The Life I Live"
 07. "Kross Roads" (featuring Pete Rock)
 08. "To Each His Own" (featuring Large Professor & Q-Tip)
 09. "Fakin Jax'"
 10. "What You Say"
 11. "Props"
 12. "Center Of Attention"
 13. "Grown Man Sport" (featuring Meccalicious)
 14. "Mind Over Matter"

Deda - The Original Baby Pa 
(Due to distribution issues, this LP was shelved until it appeared on the Lost & Found: Hip Hop Underground Soul Classics in 2003.)

 01. "Everyman"
 02. "Baby Pa"
 03. "How I'm Livin'"
 04. "Blah Uno"
 05. "Can't Wait"
 06. "I Originate"
 07. "Markd4Death"
 08. "Nasty Scene"
 09. "Nothing More"
 10. "Press Rewind"
 11. "Rhyme Writer"
 12. "Too Close"
 13. "Understand?"

Rakim 
 “Living for the City”

1996

Common - The Bitch In Yoo / The Real Weight 12" 
 A1. "The Bitch in Yoo"

Sadat X - Wild Cowboys 
 14. "Escape from New York"

Lost Boyz - Legal Drug Money 
 02. "The Yearn"

Various artists - High School High (soundtrack) 
 07. "The Rap World" - performed by Pete Rock and Large Professor (co-produced by Large Professor)

Pete Rock & CL Smooth - Searching 12" 
 B1. "We Specialize"

Slick Rick - Lost Tracks 
 A1. "Sleazy Gynecologist"

Various artists -  America Is Dying Slowly (soundtrack) 
 02. "The Yearn" - performed by Pete Rock and The Lost Boyz

1997

Rakim - The 18th Letter 
 06. "The Saga Begins"
 14. "When I'm Flowin'"

Mic Geronimo - Vendetta 
 08. "Unstoppable"

Various artists - Dangerous Ground (soundtrack) 
 04. "Keep On Pushin'" - performed by MC Lyte, Bahamadia, Nonchalant and Yo-Yo

A.D.O.R. - Enter The Center 12" 
 A1. "Enter The Center"

1998

All City - Metropolis Gold 
 03. "Priceless"

A.D.O.R. - Shock Frequency 
 01. "The Penetration (interlude)"
 10. "Enter the Center"

Funkmaster Flex
 "Prime Time" (featuring Xzibit, Phil Da Agony, and Tha Alkaholiks)

Pete Rock - Soul Survivor (Pete Rock album) 
 01. Soul Survivor Intro
 02. Tru Master	
 03. Half Man Half Amazin (co-produced by Grap Luva)
 04. Respect Mine
 05. Tha Game
 06. #1 Soul Brother
 07. Rock Steady Part II	
 08. Truly Yours 98	
 09. It's About That Time	
 10. One Life To Live	
 11. Take Your Time	
 12. Mind Blowin'	
 13. Soul Survivor	
 14. Da Two	
 15. Verbal Murder 2
 16. Strange Fruit	
 17. Massive (Hold Tight)

1999

Raekwon - Immobilarity 
 16. "Sneakers"

Inspectah Deck - Uncontrolled Substance 
 12. "Trouble Man" (featuring Vinia Mojica)

Rahzel - Make The Music 2000 
 04. "All I Know"

2000

Slum Village - Fantastic, Vol. 2 
 14. "Once Upon a Time" (featuring Pete Rock) (co-produced by J Dilla)
 "Once Upon a Time (Pete Rock remix)"

Big L - The Big Picture 
 06. "Holdin' It Down" (featuring A.G., Miss Jones & Stan Spit)
 13. "Who You Slidin' Wit" (featuring Stan Spit)

Rah Digga - Dirty Harriet 
 04. "What They Call Me"

Freddie Foxxx - Industry Shakedown 
 06. "Who Knows Why?"
 09. "Industry Shakedown"
 13. "Bumpy Knuckles Baby"

Phife Dawg - Ventilation: Da LP 
 07. "Lemme Find Out" (featuring Pete Rock)
 12. "Melody Adonis"

Rob-O - Superspectacular 
 A4. "Star Qualities"
 B4. "So Many Rappers"

Screwball - Y2K: The Album 
 08. "You Love To Hear These Stories" (featuring MC Shan)

Muro - Pan Rhythm: Flight No. 11154 
 10. "Patch Up the Pieces" (featuring Freddie Foxxx)

Ed O.G. - The Truth Hurts 
 11. "Situations"

2001

Busta Rhymes - Genesis 
 04. "Shut 'Em Down 2002"

Guru - Baldhead Slick & da Click 
 11. "Pimp Shit" (featuring Keason & Kreem)

J-Live - The Best Part 
 08. "Kick It to the Beat" (featuring Asheru and Probe)

Sporty Thievz - In store now 
 09. "Street cinema 2"

the U.N. - World Domination: The Mixtape 
 02. "How You Want It"
 04. "Cake"
 07. "The Avenue"
 08. "Nothin' Lesser"

2002

Non Phixion - The Future Is Now 
 04. "If You Got Love"

DJ Spinderella 
 "Burn'Em"

Heather B. - Eternal Affairs 
 11. "Dedicated" (featuring Tammy Lucas & Pete Rock)

Troy S.L.U.G.S. - Get It 4 Real 12" 
 A1. "Get It 4 Real"

Big Tone – Party Crasher 
 B3. Good Life (featuring 87)

2003

Keith Murray - He's Keith Murray 
 16. "Say Goodnite" (co-produced by Erick Sermon)

PMD - The Awakening 
 18. "Buckwild"

Curse - Sinnflut 
 05. "Nimm's Leicht"

J Dilla - Pay Jay 
 04. "Remember" (featuring Billal)

Prozack Turner - Wonderful Life

Killa Sha - The Black Eminem 
 23. "Iron Hand"

Nas - One on One

2004

Ed O.G. - My Own Worst Enemy 
 01. "Boston"
 02. "Just Call My Name"
 03. "Voices"
 04. "School'em"
 06. "Pay The Price"
 08. "Right Now!"
 09. "Stop Dat"

Krumbsnatcha - Never Grow Up / Here We Go 12"
 B1. "Here We Go" (featuring Guru)

Mr. Cheeks - Ladies & Ghettomen 
 03. "All I Know" (featuring Babydoll, and Madman)
 05. "Keep It Movin"
 07. "Turn It Up" (featuring Wild Walt, and Madman)

DJ Rhettmatic  – Exclusive Collection 
 13. Pete Rock "Collector's Item" (featuring Grap Luva)

Pete Rock 
 "Blindsided" (featuring LMNO & The Kozmonautz)

Roc Marciano - Strength and Honor 
 06. "Pimpin' Ain't Easy"
 10. "Fall Back"

Tony Touch - The Piece Maker 2 
 14. "Out Da Box" (featuring Large Professor, Masta Ace, and Pete Rock)

The UN - UN Or U Out 
 04. "Avenue"
 08. "Ain't No Thang"
 14. "Game Of Death"

Northern State - All City 
 09. "Time To Rhyme" (featuring Pete Rock)

Kreators - Live Coverage 
 03. "Night Life" (featuring Nicki Richards & Cheryl Pepsii Riley)

Planet Asia - Full Course Meals

De La Soul - Days Off 
 04. "Stay Away" (featuring Pete Rock & Rob-O)

2005

Jim Jones - Harlem: Diary of a Summer 
 03. "G's Up" (featuring Max B)

Leela James 
 "Good Time" (featuring Pete Rock & C.L. Smooth)

One Be Lo - Still Born 
 13. "Deceptacons" (Pete Rock Remix)

Muneshine - Opportunity Knocks 
 08. "Imagine That"

Planet Asia As King Medallions – Jewelry Box Sessions: Part One 
 15. "Jewelry Box Session"

2006

Ghostface Killah - Fishscale 
 10. "R.A.G.U." (featuring Raekwon)
 14. "Be Easy" (featuring Trife da God)
 17. "Dogs of War" (featuring Raekwon, Cappadonna, Sun God & Trife da God)

Masta Killa - Made in Brooklyn 
 08. "Older Gods Part 2"

CL Smooth - American Me 
 11. "It's a Love Thing"

Boot Camp Clik - The Last Stand 
 06. "1-2-3"

Raekwon - The Vatican Mixtape Vol. 1 
 25. "Kids That's Rich"

Freddie Foxxx - Street Triumph Mixxxtape 
 24. "The Chancellor"
 27. "Patch Up The Pieces"
 30. "U Krazy"
 35. "Mind Frame"

Rob-O - Rhyme Pro 
 02. "Stay Away" (featuring De La Soul)
 06. "Mention Me"
 07. "So Many Rappers"
 09. "Superspectacular"

Pitch Black - Revenge 
 11. "Block To The Boardroom"

Pete Rock 
 Revenge (featuring Grap Luva)

Postaboy - Return Of A Living Legend Vol.1 
 12. "It's The Postaboy"

2007

Keyshia Cole - Just Like You 
 09. "Got to Get My Heart Back"

Redman - Red Gone Wild: Thee Album 
 04. "Gimmie One"

Talib Kweli - Eardrum 
 06. "Holy Moly" 
 12. "Stay Around"

Styles P - Super Gangster (Extraordinary Gentleman) 
 18. "Gangster, Gangster" (performed by The L.O.X.)

Special Teamz - Stereotypez 
 04. "Boston to Bucktown" (featuring Sean Price and Buckshot)

CL Smooth - The Outsider 
 13. "Love Is A Battlefield"

Skyzoo - Corner Store Classic 
 07. "Straighten It Out"

2008

Jim Jones - Harlem's American Gangster 
 11. "Up in Harlem"

Termanology - Politics as Usual 
 12. "We Killin' Ourselves"
 15. "Hold That" [Bonus track]

Vast Aire - Dueces Wild 
 06. "Mecca and the Ox" (featuring Vordul Mega)

Muneshine 
 "These Days (Remix)" (featuring Emilio Rojas & D-Sisive)

Charles Hamilton - Death of the Mixtape Rapper 
 01. "Stay on Your Level"

Rashid Hadee - A Change Gon’ Come 
 27. "Oxygen" (featuring Pugs Atomz)

CL Smooth 
 "Multi Bars of Fury"

Killa Sha – The Black Eminem 
 23. "Iron Hand"

2009

Method Man & Redman - Blackout! 2 
 03. "A-Yo" (featuring Saukrates)

Raekwon - Only Built 4 Cuban Linx... Pt. II 
 03. "Sonny's Missing"

Ras Kass - Quarterly 
 06. "If This World Was Mine"

Cormega - Born and Raised 
 06. "Live And Learn"

Earatik Statik - The Good, the Bad and the Ugly 
 13. "Tearz!"

Krumb Snatcha - Hidden Scriptures 
 15. "Yesterday"
 19. "Begins"

2010

Cypress Hill - Rise Up 
 02. "Light It Up"

Kurupt - Streetlights 
 06. "Yessir"

Ghostface Killah - Apollo Kids 
 08. "How You Like Me Baby"

Sadat X - Wild Cowboys II 
 02. "Turn it Up"

Fintelligens - Mun Tie Tai Maantie 
 07. "Kaiku"

DoItAll - American DU 
 05. "Surrender"

Red Cafe 
 "Heart and soul of New-York City"

2011

Jay-Z & Kanye West - Watch the Throne 
 16. "The Joy" (produced with Kanye West, Mike Dean and Jeff Bhasker) [Bonus track]

Styles P - Master of Ceremonies 
 06. "Children" (featuring Pharoahe Monch)

Torae - For the Record 
 06. "That Raw"

Catalyst - Cat's Life 2 
 06. "What You Waiting For"

Pete Rock & Smif-N-Wessun - Monumental 
 01. "Intro"
 02. "Monumental" (featuring Tyler Woods)
 03. "Prevail" (featuring Raekwon)
 04. "That's Hard" (featuring Sean Price and Styles P)
 05. "Top of the World" (featuring Memphis Bleek)
 06. "Feel Me" (featuring Rock and Bun B)
 07. "Roses" (featuring Freeway)
 08. "Fire"
 09. "This One" (featuring Top Dog and Jahdan Blakkamoore)
 10. "Do It" (featuring Hurricane G)
 11. "Night Time" (featuring Buckshot)
 12. "(I'm A) Stand Up Guy" (featuring Black Rob)
 13. "Go Off"
 14. "Time To Say"

Reks – Rhythmatic Eternal King Supreme 
 02. "Thin Line"

2012

38 Spesh - Time Served 
 21. "Support" (featuring Styles P)

Chris Turner - LOVElife Is A Challenge 
 15. "Sticky Green"

Lord Lhus - Underground Stash 
 07. "The Elite Group"

2013

Ill Bill - The Grimy Awards 
 05. "Truth"
 13. "When I Die" (Remix) (featuring Tia Thomas)

N.O.R.E. - Student of the Game 
 08. "Vitamins" (featuring Pete Rock)

Aer - Strangers 
 05. "Tell it Straight" (featuring Guy Harrison)

Mack Wilds - New York: A Love Story 
 11. "The Art of Fallin" 
 13. "Duck Sauce"

Blu
 The Clean Hand

Canibal Ox - Gotham 
 13. "Mecca & The Ox"

2014

Ed O.G - After All These Years 
 01. "2 Turntables's & A Mic"
 04. "Make Music"
 09. "Let Da Horns Blow"

Smoke DZA - Dream.ZONE.Achieve 
 21. "Achieve"

2015

The Watch Episode II: Favor The Bold 
 07. Dame Grease - After The Show (featuring Niamson)

2016

Torae - Entitled 
 03. "Get Down"

Grafh - Pain Killers: Reloaded 
 05. "Wrong One" (featuring Royce da 5'9")

Mistah F.A.B. - Son of a Pimp, Pt. 2 
 08. "What Yo Hood Like" (featuring Jadakiss)

Smoke DZA - George Kush Da Button (Don't Pass Trump the Blunt) 
 15. "Unfuckwittable" (featuring Roc Marciano and Domo Genesis)

Sadat X - Agua 
 01. "Freeze"

G. Huff 
 "Bills" (featuring Vice Souletric)

De La Soul - and the Anonymous Nobody... 
 05. "Memory of... (Us)" (featuring Estelle and Pete Rock)

Snyp Life - Back Again 
 02. "Oh No" (featuring Sheek Louch)

The Lox - Filthy America... It's Beautiful 
 10. "Filthy America"

J Dilla - The Diary 
 11. "The Ex" (featuring Billa)

Smoke DZA & Pete Rock - "Don't Smoke Rock" 
 01. "Intro"
 02. "Limitless" (featuring Dave East)
 03. "Black Superhero Car" (featuring Rick Ross)
 04. "Hold the Drums" (featuring Royce da 5'9")
 05. "Moving Weight, Pt. 1" (featuring Cam'ron and NymLo)
 06. "Wild 100s"
 07. "Last Name"
 08. "1 of 1"
 09. "Milestone" (featuring BJ the Chicago Kid, Jadakiss and Styles P)
 10. "Show Off" (featuring Wale)
 11. "Dusk 2 Dusk" (featuring Big K.R.I.T., Dom Kennedy. and theMIND)
 12. "I Ain't Scared"
 13. "Until Then" (featuring Mac Miller)

2017

Dane Uno - Everything In The Dark Comes To The Light 
 05. "Remedy"

2018

Apathy - The Widow's Son 
 08. "I Keep On" (featuring Pharoahe Monch and Pete Rock)

Westside Gunn - Supreme Blientele 
 04. "Brutus" (featuring Benny The Butcher & Conway The Machine)
 13. "The Steiners" (featuring Elzhi)

Conway the Machine - Everybody is F.O.O.D. 
 03. "Piper"

Kool G Rap & 38 Spesh - Son Of G Rap 
 11. "Flow Gods" (featuring Freddie Gibbs & Meyhem Lauren)
 15. "Aborted Child"

V-Stylez – Thornton Melon 
 04. "Detropolis"

2019

Illa Ghee - The Whole Half Of It 
02. "Malvo"

Flee Lord - Geats Greater Later 
06. "For a Reason" (featuring Elcamino)

Ras Kass - Soul on Ice 2 
14. "Can u feel it"

Nas - The Lost Tapes 2
10. "The Art of It" (featuring J. Myers)
15. "QueensBridge Politics"

Skyzoo & Pete Rock - Retropolitan 
01. "Men Like Us (Intro)"
02. "Glorious"
03. "Truck Jewels"
04. "Carry The Tradition" (featuring Styles P)	
05. "Homegrown"	
06. "It's All Good"	
07. "Ten Days"	
08. "Richie"	
09. "Penny Jerseys"	
10. "One Time"	(featuring Raheem DeVaughn)
11. "Eastern Conference All-Stars" (featuring Benny the Butcher, Conway the Machine, Westside Gunn & Elzhi)	
12. "The Audacity of Dope"

Smoke DZA & Benny the Butcher - Statue of Limitations 
01. "By Any Means"
02. "Bullets" (featuring Conway the Machine)
03. "Smoke and Butchered" (featuring Styles P)
04. "7:30" (featuring Westside Gunn)
05. "Drug Rap"
06. "Toast"

Flee Lord & Grafh - Dirty Restaurant 
06. "Cold Outside"

2020

Grafh & DJ Green Lantern – The Oracle III 
B4. "Stove Work"

M-Dot – Ego and The Enemy (Part 2) 
"The Atonement"

Busta Rhymes – Extinction Level Event 2: The Wrath of God 
03. "Strap Yourself Down" (co-produced by J Dilla)

Kool Taj The Gr8 & Pete Rock 
"Llayers"

2021

Papoose - March 
01. "Don't Make You Real"

Remixes

A.D.O.R.
Let It All Hang Out (Pete Rock Remix)

Akiko
 Back Home (Soul Brother's Midnight Mix)

Akhenaton
 La Face B (Pete Rock Remix)

Alexander O'Neal
 In The Middle (No Rap Mix) 
 In The Middle (Brown Mix) (featuring Pete Rock & CL Smooth)
 In The Middle (Brown Surround Mix) (featuring Pete Rock & CL Smooth)

A Tribe Called Quest
 1nce Again (Pete Rock Remix)

AZ
 Gimme Yours (Remix)
 Gimme Yours (Alternate Remix)

Basic Black
 She's Mine (Radio Mix) (featuring Pete Rock & CL Smooth)
 She's Mine (Extended Club Mix)
 She's Mine (Hip-Hop Radio Mix)
 With The Untouchables

Big L
 Put It On (Pete Rock Remix)

The Black Eyed Peas
 They Don't Want Music (Pete Rock Remix) (featuring James Brown)

Black Star
 Respiration (Flying High Mix) (featuring Black Thought)

Brand Nubian
 Slow Down (Pete Rock's Newromix)

Cappadonna
 Slang Editorial (Remix)

Champ MC - Keep It on the Real 12" 
 B1. "Keep It on the Real (Pete Rock Remix)"

Cormega
 Never Personal (Pete Rock Remix)

D-Block
 Like That Y'all (Remix) (featuring AP, Snyp Life & Straw)

Da Beatminerz
 Open (Pete Rock Remix) (featuring Caron Wheeler and Pete Rock)

Da Youngsta's
 Iz U Wit Me? (Pete Rock Remix)
 "Pass Da Mic (Remix)"

Das EFX
 Jussummen (Pete Rock Remix)
 Real Hip-Hop (Pete Rock Remix)

EPMD - Rampage 12" 
 A1. "Rampage (Remix Extended)" (featuring LL Cool J)
 A2. "Rampage (Hardcore To The Head Mix)" (featuring LL Cool J)

Father MC
 Lisa Baby (Hip Hop Fat Mix)
 Lisa Baby (Smoothed Out Mix)

F.I.L.T.H.E.E.
 Ayayay (Remix) (featuring Ice-T & Grandmaster Caz)

G. Huff 
 "Bills (Remix)" (featuring Smoke DZA)

Gang Starr
 The Militia (Pete Rock Remix) (featuring Big Shug & Freddie Foxxx)

Ghostface Killah
 Be Easy (Remix) (featuring Ice Cube & Trife Da God)
 Charlie Brown (Remix)

Grand Agent - This Is What They Meant (Ge-ology Remixes) 
 A3. "This is What They Meant (Pete Rock's Original Version)"

Grand Puba
 Issues (Pete Rock remix)

Heavy D & the Boyz -  Is It Good To You 12" 
 A2. "Is It Good To You (Straight Mix)"

House of Pain - House of Pain 
 18. "Jump Around (Pete Rock Remix)" (featuring Pete Rock)

Incognito
 Roots (Pete Rock Remix)

INI
 Fakin' Jax (Rude Youth Mix) (featuring Pete Rock & Meccalicious)

Jamal - Fades Em All 12" 
 A1. "Fades Em All (Pete Rock Remix)"

Jeru the Damaja - You Can't Stop the Prophet 12" 
 B1. "You Can't Stop the Prophet (Pete Rock Remix)"

Jesse Powell
 I Wasn't With It (Remix) (featuring Sauce Money)

Johnny Cash
 Folsom Prison Blues (Pete Rock Remix)

Johnny Gill
 Rub You The Right Way (Extended Hype) (featuring CL Smooth)
 Rub You The Right Way (Remix Edit) (featuring CL Smooth)
 With The Untouchables

K-Solo
 Letterman (Pete Rock Remix)
Remix & additional production by Pete Rock & C.L. Smooth

KRS-One 
 "Get Yourself Up (Pete Rock remix)"

Lady Gaga
 Poker Face (Pete Rock Remix)

Lords of the Underground - Flow On 12" 
 A2. "Flow On (Pete Rock Remix)"

Lost Boyz
 Renee (Pete Rock Remix)

M.O.P. 
 "Stick To Ya Gunz (Pete Rock Remix)" (featuring Kool G Rap)

Mary J. Blige
 Reminisce (Pete Rock & CL Smooth Remix)
 Family Affair (Pete Rock Remix) (featuring CL Smooth)

Me-2-U - Want U Back 12" 
 A1. "Want U Back (Pete Rock's Mix)"

Michael Jackson
 Butterflies (Pete Rock Remix)

Mona Lisa 
 You Said (Pete Rock Remix) (featuring C.L. Smooth)

Monica - Before You Walk Out of My Life 12" 
 A1. "Before You Walk Out of My Life (Pete Rock Remix)"

Nas
 It Ain't Hard to Tell (Pete Rock Remix)
 Favour For A Favour (Pete Rock Remix) (featuring Scarface)
 Street Dreams (Pete Rock Remix) (featuring R. Kelly)

Nature 
 Ultimate High (Pete Rock Remix) (featuring Nas)

Naughty By Nature 
 Hip-Hop Hooray (Pete Rock Remix)

Nick Holder
 No More Dating DJ's (Pete Rock Remixes) (featuring Jemini)

The Notorious B.I.G.
 Juicy (Remix)

Panda Bear
 Crosswords (Pete Rock Remix)

Pete Rock & CL Smooth 
 Take You There (Remix)
 Get on the Mic (Remix)
 Lots of Lovin (Remix)
 Searching (Remix)
 Good Life (Group Home Mix)

PM Dawn
 Looking Through Patient Eyes (Pete Rock Mix)

Psycho Realm
 Stone Garden (Pete Rock Remix)

Public Enemy 

 "Shut 'Em Down (Pe-te Rock Mixx)"

 "Nighttrain (Get Up Get Involved Throwdown Mixx)"
 "Nighttrain (Pete Rock Strong Island Mt. Vernon Meltdown)" (featuring C.L. Smooth)

Pushim
 Soldier (Pete Rock Remix)

Redman 
 Whateva Man (Pete Rock remix) (featuring Erick Sermon)

Ren Thomas
 I Been Nice (Remix)

Robert Glasper - Black Radio Recovered: The Remix EP 
 02. "Black Radio (Pete Rock Remix)" (featuring Yasiin Bey)

Rough House 
 Rough House (Pete Rock Remix)

Scha Dara Parr
 Kanata Kara No Tegami (Pete Rock Remix)

Scritti Politti 
 Tinseltown to the Boogiedown (Pete Rock Remix) (featuring Mos Def and Lee Majors)

Sister Souljah - Killing Me Softly; Deadly Code Of Silence 12" 
 A1. "Killing Me Softly; Deadly Code Of Silence (Remix)"

Sporty Thievz 
 Street Cinema 2 (Pete Rock Remix)

Steph Pockets - My Crew Deep 
 16. "My Crew Deep (Pete Rock Remix)"

YG'z
 Groove On (Pete Rock Mix)
 Street N*gga (Remix)

Yo La Tengo
 Here To Fall (Pete Rock Remix)

Other

Doo Wop
 Back Of Your Mind (featuring Da Ranjahz)
 Do New Things (featuring Joell Ortiz)
 Refuse 2 Lose

Fas Action 
 "I'm The King" (featuring Dubb & Hot Dollar)

Freddie Foxxx 
 "We Gon Win"
 "Rayon"

Ghostface Killah 
 "Chunky"

Grap Luva 
 "Beats & Rhymes"

Haph of Da Ranjahz
 Back Of Your Mind

J Dilla 
 "Remember" (featuring Bilal)

DJ Kay Slay 
 "Up In Harlem" (featuring Juelz Santana, Hell Rell & JR Writer)

Kmac 
 "Slow Jam"

KRS-One 
 "Go South-Bronx" (featuring Pete Rock)

Krumb Snatcha 
 "Here We Go" (featuring Guru)

Talib Kweli 
 "Brooklyn Story"

Meccalicious (Mekolicious) 
 "Hope The World Don't Stop"
 "How You Feelin"
 "The Youth"
 "Meccalicious (One Time)"
 "Sending This One Out"
 "What You Waitin 4"
 "Slow It Down (Rewind That Part)"

Marley Marl and Pete Rock 
 This Life Forever (co-produced by Marley Marl)

Terrace Martin 
 "Jazz, Soul & Hip-Hop" (featuring Pete Rock)

M.O.P. 
 "Here Comes the Realness" (featuring Pete Rock)

Nas 
 "Analyze This" (featuring Jay-Z & Lord Tariq)

Passi 
 "Who Is This" (featuring Pete Rock & CL Smooth)

Planet Asia 
 Full Course Meal

Prozack Turner 
 Wonderful Life

Red Cafe 
 Heart And Soul Of New-York City

Rob-O 
 If I Die
 War

Slick Rick 
 "World Renown"
 "Gambling"

Tommy Tee 
 "World Renown" (featuring Pete Rock, Mike Zoot, Large Professor and AG)

Eddie Wellz 
 Soular Flare

YZ 
 "Do Or Die (Pete Rock Remix)"

Discography
Production discographies
Discographies of American artists
Hip hop discographies